The R308 is a Regional Route in South Africa that connects R356 near Fraserburg with Carnarvon.

References

External links
 Routes Travel Info

Regional Routes in the Northern Cape